NCMA may refer to:

Organizations 
National Contract Management Association
National Concrete Masonry Association
Professional Association for Childcare and Early Years (formerly known as National Childminding Association)
North Carolina Museum of Art